Bellestar it is a small town in the municipality of Montferrer i Castellbò, in Alt Urgell, Catalonia. It has a population of approximately 90. It lies to west of the small river Mare de Déu de la Trobada.

Populated places in Alt Urgell